was a trilogy of professional wrestling events promoted by the Japanese professional wrestling promotion World Wonder Ring Stardom. They took place beginning with November 3, 2021 and culminated on December 18, 2021, with a limited attendance for each event due in part to the ongoing COVID-19 pandemic at the time.

Storylines 
The making of various of the first main card's matches relate to previous events from Stardom 10th Anniversary Grand Final Osaka Dream Cinderella pay-per-view which took place on October 9, 2021. Moments after winning the Future of Stardom Championship from Unagi Sayaka with help from Oedo Tai stablemate Rina who intervened in the match, Ruaka received a title challenge from Lady C. Syuri nominated AZM as the next challenger for the SWA World Championship, Unagi Sayaka challenged Tam Nakano for the Wonder of Stardom Championship and Hazuki announced she will form a tag team with Koguma in the 2021 edition of the Goddesses of Stardom Tag League.

After Hayashishita successfully defended her World of Stardom Championship against Takumi Iroha in the main event, Hazuki and Maika came to the ring to challenge her for a title match. Syuri also stepped up to remind the latter two that she is the rightful challenger for the red belt. It remained for Hazuki to challenge Hayashishita on November 3.

Kawasaki Super Wars

The Kawasaki Super Wars was the first part of the Stardom Super Wars Trilogy of events promoted by World Wonder Ring Stardom which took place on November 3, 2021. The preshow matches were broadcast on Stardom's YouTube channel.

Event
The show featured nine professional wrestling matches that resulted from scripted storylines, where wrestlers portrayed villains, heroes, or less distinguishable characters in the scripted events that built tension and culminated in a wrestling match or series of matches.

After Mai Sakurai clearly pinned Waka Tsukiyama to win the match, a mysterious masked silhouette walked down to the ring and attacked both. Following her first successful defense of the Future of Stardom Championship against Lady C, Ruaka received a title challenge from both Waka Tsukiyama and Mai Sakurai which she accepted. Konami was initially scheduled to face Saya Kamitani, Mina Shirakawa and Maika in a four-way match but was later pulled out of the bout due to not being yet cleared to compete after being hospitalized with food poisoning.

Koguma issued a challenge for Starlight Kid's High Speed Championship, Himeka stepped up for Donna Del Mondo stablemate Syuri's SWA World Championship and World of Stardom Championship challenge rights certificate, once again a Cosmic Angels member Mina Shirakawa challenged Tam Nakano for the Wonder of Stardom Championship and finally Utami Hayashishita received the request from Maika to a match for the "red belt".

Results

Tokyo Super Wars

The Tokyo Super Wars was the second part of the Stardom Super Wars Trilogy of events promoted by World Wonder Ring Stardom which took place on November 27, 2021. The preshow match was broadcast on Stardom's YouTube channel. The main sponsor of the event was Schwarzkopf Professional. Giulia joined the commentary team only for the title matches.

Event
The show featured eight professional wrestling matches that resulted from scripted storylines, where wrestlers portrayed villains, heroes, or less distinguishable characters in the scripted events that built tension and culminated in a wrestling match or series of matches.

After Ruaka successfully defended her Future of Stardom Championship against Mai Sakurai and Waka Tsukiyama in the pre-show, the masked superstar which also made and appearance at Kawasaki Wars back on November 3, attacked again but Starlight Kid rushed down the ring to save Ruaka. Hanan later stepped up to challenge the latter to a match for the Future title at Dream Queendom on December 29 which Ruaka accepted. After Stars defeated Oedo Tai in the six-woman tag team match, Rina challenged Hazuki to a match in which the loser won't be allowed to wear black lipstick anymore. Rina said that is her rightful gimmick. After Starlight Kid retained the High Speed Championship against Koguma, AZM came down to challenge her for a title shot. Koguma said that even if she lost she wants to challenge again. Kid accepted the three-way match for Dream Queendom on December 29. Following Nakano's successful defense against Shirakawa, Saya Kamitani who just became the number one contender earlier that night came down to challenge Tam for the Wonder of Stardom Championship with the latter accepting in for December 29. 

The main event saw Utami Hayashishita defeating Maika to successfully defend the World of Stardom Championship for the ninth time in a row. After the match. Syuri came down to shake hands with Hayashishita, therefore officializing their World of Stardom Championship match at Dream Queendom on December 29.

Results

Osaka Super Wars

The Osaka Super Wars was the third and final part of the Stardom Super Wars Trilogy of events promoted by World Wonder Ring Stardom which took place on December 18 2021. The only preshow match was broadcast on Stardom's YouTube channel.

Storylines
The show featured five professional wrestling matches that resulted from scripted storylines, where wrestlers portrayed villains, heroes, or less distinguishable characters in the scripted events that built tension and culminated in a wrestling match or series of matches. The event will host a four-team tournament in which the winner unit will receive a prize of ten million yen. 

The event was scheduled to see Queen's Quest taking on Oedo Tai in an elimination tag team match with Momo Watanabe and Starlight Kid as captains of their own teams with the match set to culminate a feud between Watanabe and Starlight Kid which began at Kawasaki Super Wars and was part of Oedo Tai's strategy to try to gain more recruits into their unit. The captain of the losing team would forced to join the enemy unit in the process.

Event
The preshow match saw Syuri defeating Lady C, Mai Sakurai and Waka Tsukiyama in a 3-on-1 handicap gauntlet match. After Syuri left the venue, two masked silhouettes rushed to the ring to attack Sakurai, Tsukiyama and C. The fourth match of the event was disputed between Queen's Quest and Oedo Tai in the elimination tag team match. While down to Kid versus Watanabe, the latter betrayed the stable and attacked AZM with a steel chair to get herself disqualified in a shocking manner to join the enemy team. The former Queen's Quest leader declared that she would be Oedo Tai's black peach (reference to her real Japanese name Momo (モモ) meaning peach). The main event saw MaiHimePoi defeat Mayu Iwatani, Hazuki and Koguma to win the 10 million yen prize and also to retain the Artist of Stardom Championship for the second time on the same night after picking up a victory against Marvelous' Takumi Iroha, Rin Kadokura and Maria earlier. They received a challenge from Cosmic Angels' Unagi Sayaka, Mina Shirakawa and Mai Sakurai for Stardom Dream Queendom on December 29 which the Donna Del Mondo subgroup accepted.

Matches

References

External links
Official Stardom World (in english)
We Are Stardom (Twitter)

2021 in professional wrestling
World Wonder Ring Stardom shows
Professional wrestling in Osaka
Professional wrestling in Tokyo